The following is a list of the 21 cantons of the Loiret department, in France, following the French canton reorganisation which came into effect in March 2015:

 Beaugency
 Châlette-sur-Loing
 Châteauneuf-sur-Loire
 Courtenay
 La Ferté-Saint-Aubin
 Fleury-les-Aubrais
 Gien
 Lorris
 Le Malesherbois
 Meung-sur-Loire
 Montargis
 Olivet
 Orléans-1
 Orléans-2
 Orléans-3
 Orléans-4
 Pithiviers
 Saint-Jean-de-Braye
 Saint-Jean-de-la-Ruelle
 Saint-Jean-le-Blanc
 Sully-sur-Loire

References